A logarithmic timeline is a timeline laid out according to a logarithmic scale.  This necessarily implies a zero point and an infinity point, neither of which can be displayed. The most natural zero point is the Big Bang, looking forward, but the most common is the ever-changing present, looking backward. (Also possible is a zero point in the present, looking forward to the infinite future.)

The idea of presenting history logarithmically goes back at least to 1932, when John B. Sparks copyrighted his chart "Histomap of Evolution". Around the same time it was also explored by the cyberneticist Heinz von Foerster, who used it to propose that memories naturally fade in an exponential manner. Logarithmic timelines have also been used in futures studies to justify the idea of a technological singularity.

A logarithmic scale enables events throughout time to be presented accurately, but enables more events to be included closer to one end. Sparks explained this by stating:
 As we travel forward in geological time the more complex is the evolution of life forms and the more are the changes to be recorded. Further, the most recent periods of evolution hold the most interest for us. We need therefore increasingly more space for our outline the nearer we approach modern times, and the logarithmic scale fulfills just this condition without any break in the continuity.

Two examples of such timelines are shown below, while a more comprehensive version (similar to that of Sparks' "Histomap") can be found at Detailed logarithmic timeline.

Example of a forward-looking logarithmic timeline 

In this table each row is defined in seconds after the Big Bang, with earliest at the top of the chart. (see Cosmological decade)

The present time is approximately  seconds after the Big Bang; the Sun and Earth formed about  seconds after the Big Bang. 1020 seconds is 3 trillion years ( years) in the future.

Example of a backward-looking logarithmic timeline 

In this table each row is defined in years ago, that is, years before the present date, with the most recent at the top of the chart. Each event is an occurrence of an observed or inferred process.  (Note that the logarithmic scale never actually gets to zero.)

See also

References

External links 
 Interview with Heinz von Foerster
 Detailed logarithmic timeline of the Universe
 History and Mathematics
 Exploring Time from Planck time to the lifespan of the universe

Chronology